Saddle Mountain State Natural Area is a state park in northwest Oregon. On clear days, the Pacific Ocean, Columbia River mouth and several of the Cascade mountains in Washington and Oregon can be seen from the summit.

History
Oregon's State Land Board was given  by the federal government on August 11, 1916, to be set aside for use as a park around Saddle Mountain. On November 21, 1928, the state highway commission, who at that time operated Oregon's state parks, received  as a gift from Nellie and O. W. Taylor to use for a park. This was the first land incorporated into what was originally known as Saddle Mountain State Park.

During the Great Depression, of the 1930s, the park was the site of a Civilian Conservation Corps (CCC) camp. The state leased the land to the federal government for two years starting in June 1935. During their stay at the park, the CCC made improvements including building the main trail to the top of the mountain, constructing a  road from the Sunset Highway to the main parking lot, the parking lot itself, a picnic area, and restrooms.

On December 5, 1935, the Oregon State Land Board donated the  they received from the federal government to the state highway commission, as they felt the parks division could better manage the land. This new land, which already been logged, was incorporated into the park. Forest fires burned through many of the trees near the base of the mountain in 1936 and again in 1939. The state built an overnight camping area, a Quonset hut, and a water system complete with reservoir in 1948.

The Oregon State Board of Forestry built a fire lookout tower on the summit of Saddle Mountain in 1953. By 1997 the park had been renamed Saddle Mountain State Natural Area.

Details

Saddle Mountain Road intercepts U.S. Route 26 eight miles (13 km) east of Necanicum Junction where Oregon Route 53 meets Route 26. From the top of the peak, on clear days, mountains in the Cascade Range far to the east can be seen, as well as the Pacific Ocean to the west and the mouth of the Columbia River to the north. Amenities at the park include primitive campsites, restrooms, trails, and picnic facilities. The campground is closed from October 31 to March 1.

Natural features in the park include forests and a year-round spring near summit of the mountain. Tree species include cedar, hemlock, and spruce. Other flora include the rare Cardamine pattersonii. A herd of elk have been seen in the park.

References

External links
 
 
 

State parks of Oregon
Parks in Clatsop County, Oregon
Civilian Conservation Corps in Oregon
1928 establishments in Oregon
Protected areas established in 1928